The qualifying rounds for the 1998 French Open were played from 21 to 23 May 1998 at the Stade Roland Garros in Paris, France.

Seeds

Qualifiers

Draw

First qualifier

Second qualifier

Third qualifier

Fourth qualifier

Fifth qualifier

Sixth qualifier

Seventh qualifier

Eighth qualifier

References
 Official Results Archive (WTA)
1998 French Open – Women's draws and results at the International Tennis Federation

Women's Singles Qualifying
French Open by year – Qualifying